Crioulo Lageano longhorn beef cattle (or "raça Crioula Lageana") originated from cattle originally brought to Brazil from Portugal by the Jesuits (Jesuit Reductions) 400 years ago. The breed was probably domesticated 4000 BC in Egypt, it came to the south of Spain from the North of Africa. The center of the rest population (just 700 individuals) is the plateau of Lages, Santa Catarina, Brazil.

It is similar to the Franqueira breed (just 500 individuals, eight to ten farmers in Rio Grande do Sul), with the same origin, which coming from Franca, São Paulo, spread through the Brazilian territory.

Naturalized Brazilian cattle breeds

Most of the naturalized Brazilian cattle breeds came from three centers; São Vicente, Salvador and Recife and they were originally Portuguese breeds: the Alentejana or Transtagana, the Barrosã, the Mirandesa, the Minhota and the Arouquesa.

See also
 Bos aegyptiacus

References

External links
 Associação Brasileira de Criadores de Bovinos da Raça Crioula Lageana
 Raça Crioula Lageana
 Caracterização genética da raça bovina Crioulo Lageano por marcadores moleculares RAPD 
 Crioulo Lageano, enfim registrado
 Associação pode livrar raça bovina secular do perigo da extinção 
 Associação Brasileira dos Criadores de Caracu
 Associação de Criadores de Bovinos do Exterior - Mocho Nacional
 Associação Brasileira de Criadores de Gado Pé-Duro - Curraleiro

Cattle breeds